In mathematics, Thiele's interpolation formula is a formula that defines a rational function  from a finite set of inputs  and their function values . The problem of generating a function whose graph passes through a given set of function values is called interpolation. This interpolation formula is named after the Danish mathematician Thorvald N. Thiele. It is expressed as a continued fraction, where ρ represents the reciprocal difference:

References
 

Finite differences
Articles with example ALGOL 68 code
Interpolation